The  is a geographical region of Honshu, the largest island of Japan. In a common definition, the region includes the Greater Tokyo Area and encompasses seven prefectures: Gunma, Tochigi, Ibaraki, Saitama, Tokyo, Chiba, and Kanagawa. Slightly more than 45 percent of the land area within its boundaries is the Kantō Plain. The rest consists of the hills and mountains that form land borders with other regions of Japan.

As the Kantō region contains Tokyo, the capital and largest city of Japan, the region is considered the center of Japan's politics and economy. According to the official census on October 1, 2010, by the Statistics Bureau of Japan, the population was 42,607,376, amounting to approximately one third of the total population of Japan.

Other definitions 
The Kantō regional governors' association (関東地方知事会, Kantō chihō chijikai) assembles the prefectural governors of Ibaraki, Tochigi, Gunma, Saitama, Chiba, Tokyo, Kanagawa, Yamanashi, Nagano and Shizuoka.

The Kantō Regional Development Bureau (関東地方整備局, Kantō chihō seibi-kyoku) of the Ministry of Land, Infrastructure, Transport and Tourism in the national government is responsible for eight prefectures generally (Ibaraki, Tochigi, Gunma, Saitama, Chiba, Tokyo, Kanagawa, Yamanashi) and parts of the waterways in two others (Nagano and Shizuoka). The Kanto Bureau of Economy, Trade and Industry (関東経済産業局, Kantō keizai-sangyō-kyoku) is responsible for eleven prefectures: Ibaraki, Tochigi, Gunma, Saitama, Chiba, Tokyo, Kanagawa, Niigata, Yamanashi, Nagano and Shizuoka. The Kantō regional governors' association (関東地方知事会, Kantō chihō chijikai) assembles the prefectural governors of Ibaraki, Tochigi, Gunma, Saitama, Chiba, Tokyo, Kanagawa, Yamanashi, Nagano and Shizuoka.

In the police organization of Japan, the National Police Agency's supervisory office for Kantō (関東管区警察局, Kantō kanku keisatsu-kyoku) is responsible for the Prefectural police departments of Ibaraki, Tochigi, Gunma, Saitama, Chiba, Kanagawa, Niigata, Yamanashi, Nagano and Shizuoka. Tokyo is not part of Kantō or any NPA region, its police has a dedicated liaison office with the national agency of its own.

The Kantō Regional Development Bureau (関東地方整備局, Kantō chihō seibi-kyoku) of the Ministry of Land, Infrastructure, Transport and Tourism in the national government is responsible for eight prefectures generally (Ibaraki, Tochigi, Gunma, Saitama, Chiba, Tokyo, Kanagawa, Yamanashi) and parts of the waterways in two others (Nagano and Shizuoka). The Kanto Bureau of Economy, Trade and Industry (関東経済産業局, Kantō keizai-sangyō-kyoku) is responsible for eleven prefectures: Ibaraki, Tochigi, Gunma, Saitama, Chiba, Tokyo, Kanagawa, Niigata, Yamanashi, Nagano and Shizuoka.

Geography 

The surface geology of the Kanto Plain is the Quaternary alluvium and diluvium. The low mountain vegetation at an altitude of about 500 to 900 m in and around the plain is an evergreen broad-leaved forest zone. The distribution height range of laurel forests is 900m in Hakone, about 800m in Tanzawa and Takao, about 700m in Okutama, Oku Musashi and Oku Chichibu, about 600m in Nishijoshu, Akagiyama, Ashio Mountains and Tsukuba Mountains and about 500m in Kitage and Nasu Mountains.

Over the evergreen broad-leaved forest are deciduous broad-leaved forests such as beech, birch, and quercus crispula. In addition, coniferous forests such as Abies veitchii and Betula ermanii spread above the deciduous broad-leaved forest from an altitude of about 1100 m higher than the lower limit of the deciduous broad-leaved forest.

Mountains are spread out such as the Taishaku Mountains, Mt. Takahara, Mt. Nasu, Mt. Yamizo, and Mt. The Kanto Plain, which is the largest plain in Japan. Just north of the Enna Hills is Japan's largest alluvial fan Nasuno at the foot of Mt. The Kujukuri Plain. The southern part of Chiba prefecture is the Boso hills. The area around Kasumigaura in Ibaraki prefecture is the Joso plateau and Hitachi plateau. Gunma prefecture and the Chichibu region of Saitama prefecture are basins. Rivers such as the Arakawa and Edo rivers pour into Tokyo Bay, and the Kinugawa and Tone rivers flow into the Pacific Ocean in Inubōsaki.

Tokyo Bay is surrounded by the Boso Peninsula and the Miura Peninsula, facing the west side of Chiba Prefecture, a part of Tokyo and the east side of Kanagawa Prefecture, and borders the Pacific Ocean from Uraga Suido. The coastal area is an industrial area. The south side of Kanagawa Prefecture faces Sagami Bay and Sagami Nada. The southern coast of Ibaraki Prefecture faces Kashima Nada. The Sagami Trough, which was the epicenter of the two Kanto earthquakes, passes through Sagami Bay. Efforts are being made to take safety measures against earthquakes in various places.

The highest point is the summit of Mt. Nikko-Shirane (Mt. Oku-Shirane) on the border between Nikko City, Tochigi Prefecture and Katashina Village, Gunma Prefecture. It is the eighth highest point in Japan's prefectures. It is also the highest point north of Kanto (Kanto, Tohoku, Hokkaido). The highest points of the prefectures are Mt. Sanpo (2,483 m) in Saitama, Mt. Kumotori (2,017 m) in Tokyo, Mt. Hiru (1,673 m) in Kanagawa, Mt. Yamizo (1,022 m) in Ibaraki, and Mt. Atago (408 m) in Chiba. Atagoyama in Chiba Prefecture is the lowest among the highest peaks in each prefecture.

The region experiences a humid subtropical climate with a summer to fall precipitation maximum (Cfa/Cwa).

History 

The heartland of feudal power during the Kamakura period and again in the Edo period, Kanto became the center of modern development. Within the Greater Tokyo Area and especially the Tokyo-Yokohama metropolitan area, Kanto houses not only Japan's seat of government but also the nation's largest group of universities and cultural institutions, the greatest population and a large industrial zone. Although most of the Kanto plain is used for residential, commercial or industrial construction, it is still farmed. Rice is the principal crop, although the zone around Tokyo and Yokohama has been landscaped to grow garden produce for the metropolitan market.

In between January 1918 and April 1920, Japan was afflicted by Spanish flu pandemic, which the country clamed more than 400,000 lives.

A watershed moment of Japan's modern history took place in the late Taishō period: the Great Kantō earthquake of 1923. The quake, which claimed more than 100,000 lives and ravaged Greater Tokyo area, occurred at a time when Japan was still reeling from the economic recession in reaction to the high-flying years during World War I.

Operation Coronet, part of Operation Downfall, the proposed Allied invasion of Japan during World War II, was scheduled to land on the Kantō Plain. Most of the United States military bases on the island of Honshu are situated on the Kantō Plain. These include Naval Air Facility Atsugi, Yokota Air Base, Yokosuka Naval Base, and Camp Zama.

The name Kanto literally means "East of the Barrier". The name Kanto is nowadays generally considered to mean the region east (東) of the Hakone checkpoint (関所). An antonym of Kanto, "West of the Barrier" means the Kansai region, which lies western Honshu and was the center of feudal Japan.

After the Great Kanto earthquake (1923), many people in Kanto started creating art with different varieties of colors. They made art of earthquake and small towns to symbolize the small towns destroyed in the quake.

Subdivisions

North and South 
South Kantō is often regarded as synonymous with the Greater Tokyo Area. As part of Japan's attempts to predict earthquakes, an area roughly corresponding to South Kantō has been designated an 'Area of Intensified Observation' by the Coordinating Committee for Earthquake Prediction.

The Japanese House of Representatives' divides it into the  electorate which consists of Ibaraki, Tochigi, Gunma, and Saitama prefectures, Tokyo electorate, and the  electorate which consists of Chiba, Kanagawa, and Yamanashi prefectures (note that Yamanashi is out of the Kantō region in the orthodox definition).

Keirin's  consists of Chiba, Kanagawa, and Shizuoka prefectures.

East and West 
This division is not often but sometimes used.

 : Ibaraki, Tochigi, and Chiba prefectures.
 : Gunma, Saitama, Tokyo, Kanagawa (and sometimes Yamanashi) prefectures.

Inland and Coastal 
This division is sometimes used in economics and geography. The border can be modified if the topography is taken for prefectural boundaries.

 : Tochigi, Gunma, Saitama (and sometimes Yamanashi) prefectures.
 : Ibaraki, Chiba, Tokyo, and Kanagawa prefectures.

Greater Kantō 
Japan's national public broadcaster NHK uses  involving Yamanashi, Nagano, and Niigata prefectures for regional programming and administration.

Cities 

The Kantō region is the most highly developed, urbanized, and industrialized part of Japan. Tokyo and Yokohama form a single industrial complex with a concentration of light and heavy industry along Tokyo Bay. Other major cities in the area include Kawasaki (in Kanagawa Prefecture); Saitama (in Saitama Prefecture); and Chiba (in Chiba Prefecture). Smaller cities, farther away from the coast, house substantial light and automotive industries. The average population density reached 1,192 persons per square kilometer in 1991.

Economy 
The Kantō region largely corresponds to the Tokyo Metropolitan Area with the exception that it does not contain Yamanashi prefecture.

The Tokyo Metropolitan Area has the largest city economy in the world and is one of the major global center of trade and commerce along with New York City, Los Angeles, Shanghai, Paris, Seoul, and London.

Greater Tokyo Area 2005 

2005 average exchange rate (1 U.S. Dollar = 110.22 Yen)

Source

GDP (purchasing power parity)

The agglomeration of Tokyo is the world's largest economy, with the largest gross metropolitan product at  purchasing power parity (PPP) in the world according to a study by PricewaterhouseCoopers.

Kanto Region Metropolitan Employment Area

Sources:, Conversion rates - Exchange rates - OECD Data

Population 
The population of Kantō region is very similar to that of the Greater Tokyo Area except that it does not contain Yamanashi Prefecture and contains the rural populations throughout the region.

Per Japanese census data, and the Kantō region's data, population has continuously grown but the population growth rate has slowed since early 1992.

The Kantō region at 2018 had a population at around 43.3 million people.

See also 

 Geography of Japan
 Kanto, a fictional region in the Pokémon franchise which is based on Kantō
 Kantō dialect
 Kantō Fureai Trail, aka Capital Region Nature Trail, a collection of hiking trails circumnavigating the entire Kantō region
 Kantō Plain

References

Sources 

 Nussbaum, Louis-Frédéric and Käthe Roth. (2005). Japan encyclopedia. Cambridge: Harvard University Press. ; OCLC 58053128

External links